Bligh Park is a suburb of Sydney, in the state of New South Wales, Australia located near Windsor and Richmond. Bligh Park is located 58 kilometres west of the Sydney central business district, in the local government area of the City of Hawkesbury and is part of the Greater Western Sydney region. The postcode for Bligh Park is 2756, which also covers the suburbs of Windsor, South Windsor, Windsor Downs and Ebenezer.

History
Bligh Park is named after William Bligh, as at the time of the Rum Rebellion the Hawkesbury settlers supported the then-deposed governor, while streets in the suburb are named after ships and people on the First Fleet.

Landmarks
Bligh Park has a small local shopping centre which includes a grocery store, a takeaway store, a chemist, a bakery and a pizza shop. Bligh Park is also the home to Bligh Park Primary School, which opened in 1990. Bligh Park has two large sporting ovals: Bounty Reserve and Colonial. Both are used as training arenas for sporting clubs such as Bligh Park Cricket Club, Bligh Park Soccer Club which contains the iconic All Age Mens Div 10 side and Windsor Wolves Junior Rugby League Club.

Population
According to the 2016 census of Population, there were 6,366 people in Bligh Park.
 Aboriginal and Torres Strait Islander people made up 5.1% of the population. 
 86.7% of people were born in Australia. The next most common countries of birth were England 3.0% and New Zealand 1.6%.   
 93.4% of people only spoke English at home. 
 The most common responses for religion were Catholic 31.0%, No Religion 25.3% and Anglican 23.4%.

Notable residents
 Ashton Irwin drummer of Australian pop-rock band 5 Seconds of Summer.

References

External links

Suburbs of Sydney
City of Hawkesbury